Atho may refer to

Atho, an egg noodle dish
 A name for the Horned God, one of the two primary deities found in some neopagan, especially Wiccan, religions